The King, later Duckworth-King Baronetcy, of Bellevue in the County of Kent, was a title in the Baronetage of Great Britain. It was created on 18 July 1792 for the naval officer and colonial governor Richard King. He was succeeded by his son, the second Baronet. He was also a naval commander and fought at the Battle of Trafalgar. The fourth Baronet assumed the additional surname of Duckworth in 1888. The title became extinct on the death of the seventh Baronet in 1972.

King, later Duckworth-King baronets, of Bellevue (1792)
Sir Richard King, 1st Baronet (1730–1806)
Sir Richard King, 2nd Baronet (1774–1834)
Sir Richard Duckworth King, 3rd Baronet (1804–1887)
Sir George St Vincent Duckworth-King, 4th Baronet (1809–1891)
Sir Dudley Gordon Alan Duckworth-King, 5th Baronet (1851–1909)
Sir George Henry James Duckworth-King, 6th Baronet (1891–1952)
Sir John Richard Duckworth-King, 7th Baronet (1899–1972)

References

Extinct baronetcies in the Baronetage of Great Britain